The 1993 Northeast Conference men's basketball tournament was played from March 2–5, 1993 at campus sites of the higher seeded teams. The tournament featured the league's ten teams, seeded based on their conference record. Rider won their first ever championship with a thrilling last second shot by Darrick Suber, defeating Wagner 65–64, and received the conference's automatic bid to the 1993 NCAA Tournament.

Format
The NEC Men’s Basketball Tournament consisted of a ten-team playoff format with all games played at the venue of the higher seed. The first round was played by the four lowest seeds (7–10) and the other teams received a bye.

Bracket

All-tournament team
Tournament MVP in bold.

References

Northeast Conference men's basketball tournament
Tournament
Northeast Conference men's basketball tournament
March 1993 sports events in the United States